Grupp is a surname. Notable people with the surname include:

 Bob Grupp (born 1955), American football punter
 Julian Grupp (born 1991), German footballer
 Stephan Grupp, American pediatric oncologist

See also
 Group (disambiguation)
 Grup (disambiguation)

German-language surnames
Occupational surnames